Francisco López Monterrosa (10 October 1968 – 31 August 2021) was a Mexican Zapotec visual artist, muralist, and engraver. He died due to complications of COVID-19.

References

1968 births
2021 deaths
Mexican artists
Nagoya University alumni
People from Juchitán de Zaragoza
Deaths from the COVID-19 pandemic in Mexico